This is a list of chapters from the manga series Speed Racer, which is called in Japan: Mach GoGoGo. The chapters from Mach GoGoGo were originally published in Shueisha's Shōnen Book. Selected parts of the series were first published in short pamphlet-sized issues by NOW Comics. The first volume of the series was later published by Wildstorm Productions under the title Speed Racer: The Original Manga. This ceased production just after volume one, which was reprinted by IDW Publishing. The whole series was published by Digital Manga Publishing under the DMP Platinum imprint under the title Speed Racer: Mach Go Go Go.

References

Speed Racer